William Harold Fleece (October 1, 1935 – October 27, 2020) was an American politician and lawyer in the state of Florida.

Biography

Early life and education
Fleece was born in Pontiac, Michigan.

He graduated from Wiley High School in Terre Haute, Indiana in 1953.

He graduated from Ohio State University with a Bachelor of Science in 1957 and from the Indiana University School of Law with a Master of Laws and Juris Doctor. He is also an alumnus of Indiana State University and Stetson College of Law.

Political career
He served in the Florida House of Representatives from 1967 to 1972, representing district 53. He served as a Republican, but has since switched his party affiliation to Democrat.

Legal career
He has practiced law in St. Petersburg and Clearwater.

Personal life
He married Ellen L. Richman. They later divorced and he married Marie C. Devine. Marie passed away in 2009. He had 3 children from his marriage to Ellen. He married Anne Kantor of Tampa on October 25, 2020.

Death
Fleece passed away on October 27, 2020.

References

1935 births
2020 deaths
Members of the Florida House of Representatives
Florida Republicans
Florida Democrats
Politicians from Pontiac, Michigan
People from Terre Haute, Indiana
People from St. Petersburg, Florida
People from Clearwater, Florida
Stetson University College of Law alumni
Ohio State University alumni
Indiana University Maurer School of Law alumni
Indiana State University alumni
20th-century American lawyers
21st-century American lawyers
20th-century American politicians
Florida lawyers